Hélio Cunha Borges (born 15 May 2000), known as Hélio Borges or simply Hélio, is a Brazilian footballer who plays for Novorizontino, on loan from Azuriz. Mainly a forward, he can also play as a right back.

Club career
Born in Belém, Pará, Hélio began his career with hometown side Remo before joining Palmeiras on 18 June 2018, on loan until April 2019. He returned to his parent club in March 2019, and was promoted to their first team.

Hélio made his first team debut on 31 March 2019, coming on as a second-half substitute for Alex Sandro in a 2–0 Campeonato Paraense home win against Paragominas. He scored his first goal on 21 August, netting in a 3–0 win against Sobradinho, for the year's Copa Verde.

After being a backup option, Hélio became a regular starter for Remo in the 2020 campaign, scoring twice in the 2020 Série C as his side achieved promotion. He left the in February 2021, and signed for Azuriz in March.

On 27 May 2021, Hélio moved to Série A side Ceará on loan until the end of the year. He made his debut in the category on 17 June, replacing Stiven Mendoza late into a 1–2 home loss against Bahia.

Career statistics

Honours
Remo
Campeonato Paraense: 2019

References

External links
Ceará profile 

2000 births
Living people
Sportspeople from Belém
Brazilian footballers
Association football forwards
Campeonato Brasileiro Série A players
Campeonato Brasileiro Série B players
Campeonato Brasileiro Série C players
Clube do Remo players
Azuriz Futebol Clube players
Ceará Sporting Club players
Esporte Clube Juventude players
Grêmio Novorizontino players